The 2010 Cooper Tires Prototype Lites season was the fourth season of the series. It consisted of eight rounds which started on March 20 at Sebring International Raceway and ended on October 2 at Road Atlanta. This was one of the support series of the American Le Mans Series.

CORE Autosport's Charlie Shears was champion in the Lites 1 class, clinching the title with a round to spare. Despite winning only three races, Shears finished every race in the points and won the championship title by 45 points from his nearest rival. Brothers Antonio and Matt Downs finished in second and third places; Antonio winning races at Miller Motorsports Park and Road America, and Matt at Millville. Three-time race winner Gary Gibson and Jon Brownson, another winner at Road America completed the top five in the championship. Shears' performances helped CORE Autosport clinch the Lites 1 teams' championship, six points clear of the Downs' Eurosport Racing outfit. In Lites 2, BERG Racing's John Weisberg and Factory 48 Motorsports' Lee Alexander dominated the class, taking 13 of the 15 wins available. Weisberg's nine wins gave him the championship title by seven points on dropped scores, from four-time winner Alexander. BERG Racing also took the teams title by six points from Factory 48. Other race wins were taken by Rick Bartuska and Eric Vassian.

Schedule
All races supported the 2010 American Le Mans Series season apart from round three which was a stand-alone event. All rounds consisted of two 30 minute races.

Entry List

Season results

Championship standings

Lites 1

Lites 2

References

External links
 Cooper Tires Prototype Lites
 International Motor Sports Association

IMSA Prototype
IMSA Prototype Challenge